Meredith Lynn MacRae (May 30, 1944 – July 14, 2000) was an American actress, singer and talk show host. She is most remembered for her roles as Sally Morrison on My Three Sons (1963–1965) and as Billie Jo Bradley on Petticoat Junction (1966–1970).

Early life
MacRae was born in Houston, Texas, to parents Gordon and Sheila MacRae. Her father was stationed with the Army Air Corps in Houston at the time of her birth. Both of her parents went on to be actors. She is the sister of William Gordon MacRae, Robert Bruce MacRae, and Heather MacRae.

Career

My Three Sons
MacRae made her breakthrough appearance as Sally Anne Morrison Douglas on the ABC (later CBS) Fred MacMurray/William Frawley sitcom, My Three Sons. She played Mike's love interest for three seasons (1963–1965). She asked to be written out of the show to further explore her career.

Petticoat Junction
In 1966, MacRae signed a contract with CBS to play Billie Jo Bradley on the sitcom Petticoat Junction, starring Bea Benaderet as her television mother and Edgar Buchanan as her television uncle. Her television sisters were Betty Jo, played by Linda Kaye Henning, and Bobbie Jo, played by Lori Saunders.

MacRae was the sitcom's third actress to portray Billie Jo. Jeannine Riley played the part in the show's first two years (1963–1965) and Gunilla Hutton in the third year (1965–1966). Both of these actresses played the role as a typical boy-crazy dumb blonde. However, by MacRae's debut on the series, Billie Jo's persona was that of a strong, independent woman who focused more on a singing career, a dream she later accomplishes. She remained with the sitcom until its cancellation in 1970.

Other work
She also took over the role of Animal from Valora Noland in Bikini Beach (1964), the third beach party film produced by American International Pictures. She had an uncredited appearance on the bus in the film Ski Party (1965).  She was a guest on NBC' The Spring Thing a musical television special hosted by Bobbie Gentry and Noel Harrison. Other guests included were Goldie Hawn, Irwin C. Watson, Rod McKuen, Shirley Bassey, and Harpers Bizarre. Her other film roles included appearances in Norwood (1970), My Friends Need Killing (1976), Grand Jury (1976), Sketches of a Strangler (1978), Earthbound (1981), and The Census Taker (1984).

She made guest appearances on such shows as The Donald O'Connor Show (1968 version); The Dean Martin Show (1971); The F.B.I.; The Mike Douglas Show; The Rockford Files; Fantasy Island; Webster; CHiPS; Love, American Style; and Magnum, P.I..

MacRae was also popular in the game-show genre, appearing in numerous shows, including: Funny You Should Ask; Match Game ('60s, '70s, and '90s versions); What's My Line?; I've Got a Secret; Personality; Snap Judgment; He Said, She Said (with then-husband Greg Mullavey); Tattletales (also with Mullavey); Hollywood Squares; The Dating Game; To Tell the Truth; Password (ABC version); $10,000 Pyramid; $25,000 Pyramid; Break the Bank; Celebrity Whew!; Beat the Clock; Card Sharks; The Cross-Wits; and Family Feud.  She had even hosted an unsold game show pilot called $50,000 a Minute alongside Geoff Edwards in 1985.

In the 1980s, she hosted the talk show Mid-Morning Los Angeles, which ran for eight years. She was awarded a local Emmy Award in 1986 for her interviewing skills. Later, she created and hosted Born Famous, a PBS series on which she interviewed the offspring of celebrities. She also co-hosted VTV: Value Television with Alex Trebek.

In 1994, she narrated the audio-book version of columnist Deboarah Laake's book Secret Ceremonies: A Mormon Woman's Intimate Diary of Marriage and Beyond.

In summer stock in her teens, she appeared with Dan Dailey in Take Me Along, with Andy Williams in Bye Bye Birdie, and in Annie Get Your Gun. 

MacRae worked to raise funds for such causes as the Children's Burn Foundation, the American Cancer Society, and United Cerebral Palsy. She also lectured nationally on alcoholism and produced a TV special on the subject.

Personal life
MacRae married Richard Berger, former president of MGM, in 1964, but they divorced four years later. In 1969, she married fellow actor Greg Mullavey (famous for Mary Hartman, Mary Hartman) and had one child with him, Allison, before divorcing in 1987. Her third and final marriage was in 1995 to Phillip M. Neal, chairman and CEO of Avery-Dennison at the time of their marriage.

Death
In January 1999, MacRae began to experience vertigo and short-term memory loss. She was evaluated and her symptoms were initially thought to be due to perimenopause. She returned to her doctor complaining of severe headaches. She was told the headaches were most likely due to muscle spasms and was encouraged to do cervical spine stretching. She obtained a second opinion and was diagnosed with brain cancer, which had already progressed to stage four. Emergency surgery was performed to remove the brain tumor and decrease the pressure in her head. During the operation, she suffered cardiac arrest but was resuscitated. Though her cancer was terminal, she agreed to be part of an experimental cancer drug program. She experienced an allergic reaction to the medication that caused swelling in her brain. Two more surgeries were required to relieve the pressure. Her imbalance resulted in a fall that caused her to suffer a fracture to her hip.

On July 14, 2000, MacRae died at her Manhattan Beach home at age 56 from complications of brain cancer. Per her wishes, her body was cremated, and her ashes were scattered in the Pacific Ocean off the coast of California.

Filmography

Film

Television

Discography
Solo
 "Image of a Boy"/"Time Stands Still" — Canjo 103 (1964)
 "Who Needs Memories of Him"/"Goodbye Love" — Capitol 2000 (1967)

The Girls from Petticoat Junction (Meredith MacRae, Linda Kaye Henning and Lori Saunders)
 "I'm So Glad That You Found Me"/"If You Could Only Be Me" — Imperial 66329 (1968)
 "Wheeling, West Virginia"/"Thirty Days Hath September" — Imperial 66346 (1968)

References

External links
 

1944 births
2000 deaths
American film actresses
American child singers
American mezzo-sopranos
American television actresses
Deaths from brain cancer in the United States
Actresses from Houston
Actors from Manhattan Beach, California
Musicians from Manhattan Beach, California
20th-century American actresses
20th-century American women singers
20th-century American singers